Bill White may refer to:

Politics and law
 Bill White (Canadian politician) (1915–1981), composer and social activist, first Black Canadian to run for political office
 Bill White (lawyer) (born 1945), American lawyer who served as Public Defender for Florida's Fourth Judicial Circuit, 2004–2008
 Bill White (Missouri politician) (born 1953), American politician
 Bill White (Texas politician) (born 1954), former mayor of Houston, Texas, and candidate for the Texas gubernatorial election, 2010

Sports

Baseball
 Bill White (first baseman) (born 1934), American baseball player, sportscaster and executive
 Bill White (pitcher) (born 1978), American baseball pitcher
 Bill White (shortstop) (1860–1924), Major League Baseball shortstop with the Pittsburgh Pirates

Other sports
 Bill White (Australian footballer) (1916–1990), Australian rules footballer with Richmond
 Bill White (basketball, born 1936) (1936–1999), American college basketball coach
 Bill White (bobsleigh) (born 1959), American Olympic bobsledder
 Bill White (footballer, born 1877) (1877–1960), Scottish association football player
 Bill White (footballer, born 1907), Scottish association football player
 Bill White (ice hockey) (1939–2017), Canadian ice hockey player and coach
 Bill White (rugby union, born 1913) (1913–1969), Australian rugby union player
 Bill White (wrestler) (1945–2021), American wrestler

Other
 Bill White (comics) (1961–2012), American comic book creator and animator
 Bill White (neo-Nazi) (born 1977), American neo-Nazi activist
 Bill White (administrator) (born 1960s), President of the Intrepid Sea-Air-Space Museum and Intrepid Fallen Heroes Fund
 Bill White, bassist with American rock band The Amboy Dukes

See also
 Billy White (disambiguation)
 William White (disambiguation)
 Willie White (disambiguation)
 Bill Wight (1922–2007), American baseball pitcher
 Will White (1854–1911), American baseball player